Nabil Sayadi was the director and founder of the European branch of Global Relief Foundation, centred in Belgium.

Sayadi was born in Lebanon. He is accused that he transferred 200,000 Euros to Al-Qaeda financier Mohammed Zouaydi, which caused him to be placed on FBI and United Nations watch-lists along with his wife and GRF secretary Patricia Vinck. As a result, Belgium froze their bank accounts. Neither organization had listed any crimes with which they are associated.

He has been described by the FBI as a close friend and associate of Wadih El-Hage, personal secretary to Osama bin Laden.

On January 6, 2006, two Belgian judges exonerated Sayadi of any links with Al Qaeda after Sayadi's lawyer declared: "If the US has something against them, they should give it to us.
Recently, they won a process against the Belgian state and by that reason they are declared innocent and now have a chance of being removed from the blacklist.

Sayadi and Vinck filed a complaint in front of the human rights council. The council did not argue on the interplay of ICCPR and the UNC. But they decided that Belgium cannot review the SC decisions, but at least the obligations of Belgium under ICCPR. The council decided that Belgium violated the ICCPR as it was too fast listing Sayadi and Vinck on the blacklist, with not enough evidence.

As a result, in 2009 the names were delisted.

References

Living people
Lebanese emigrants to Belgium
Year of birth missing (living people)